The 2020 Labour Party deputy leadership election was triggered on 6 November 2019 by the resignation of Tom Watson as deputy leader of the Labour Party of the United Kingdom. It was won by Angela Rayner on the third ballot. It was held alongside the 2020 Labour Party leadership election, in which Keir Starmer was elected to succeed Jeremy Corbyn as leader.

To qualify for the ballot, candidates needed nominations from 10% (22) of the party's Members of Parliament (MPs) and Members of European Parliament (MEPs), followed by support from either 5% (33) of Constituency Labour Parties (CLPs), or from at least three affiliated groups, including two trades unions and representing at least 5% of affiliated members.

Five candidates—Rosena Allin-Khan, Richard Burgon, Dawn Butler, Ian Murray and Angela Rayner—received sufficient nominations from MPs and MEPs to proceed to the second round of nominations. Rayner achieved sufficient support from affiliates to qualify for the final ballot on 20 January, at which point she also had the greatest number of nominations from CLPs. Burgon achieved sufficient support from affiliates on 29 January, while Butler and Murray achieved sufficient support from CLPs on 2 and 7 February, respectively. Allin-Khan became the final candidate to reach the threshold when she received her 33rd CLP nomination on 8 February.

The results were announced on 4 April 2020, with Rayner announced as the winner and becoming deputy leader.

Background 
Tom Watson resigned as deputy leader of the Labour Party and as an MP in November 2019 ahead of the 2019 general election.

Procedure 
The election was conducted under a pure "one member, one vote" (OMOV) system. Candidates were elected by members and registered and affiliated supporters, who all received a maximum of one vote and all votes were weighted equally. For example, members of Labour-affiliated trade unions needed to register as affiliated Labour supporters to vote.

To stand, challengers needed to be nominated by at least 10% of the combined membership of the Parliamentary Labour Party (PLP) and European Parliamentary Labour Party (EPLP), meaning twenty-two MPs or MEPs at the time. They also needed to be nominated by at least 5% of Constituency Labour Parties (CLPs), or party affiliates that consist of at least 5% of affiliate members including at least two trades unions. Affiliates consist of affiliated trades unions, socialist societies and the Co-operative Party. The vote, as in previous elections, will be held under the alternative vote (instant-runoff) system.

Campaign 

Dawn Butler, the shadow equalities secretary, announced on 7 November 2019 that she would stand to be deputy leader. Khalid Mahmood, the shadow Europe minister, announced his candidacy on 17 December 2019. The shadow justice secretary Richard Burgon announced that he would stand on 31 December 2019 with an article in Tribune.

Angela Rayner announced her candidacy on 6 January 2020.

On 9 January, Mahmood withdrew from the contest, saying it had become clear he was unlikely to win the support of the necessary 22 MPs or MEPs.

The five remaining deputy leadership candidates achieved the requisite 22 MP/MEP nominations by the 13 January deadline and proceeded to the next stage of the contest.

Candidates

Nominated by parliamentarians 
The following individuals were nominated by the necessary number of Labour parliamentarians and were subject to receiving backing from the required number of constituency parties or affiliated organisations.

Withdrawn

Declined 
 Jonathan Ashworth, Shadow Health Secretary, MP for Leicester South (endorsed Rayner)
Yvette Cooper, chair of the Home Affairs Select Committee (endorsed Rayner)
 Barry Gardiner, Shadow International Trade Secretary (endorsed Rayner)
Louise Haigh, Shadow Policing Minister (endorsed Rayner)
Ian Lavery, chair of the Labour Party (endorsed Burgon)
 Conor McGinn, MP for St Helens North (endorsed Rayner)
 Jess Phillips, MP for Birmingham Yardley (ran for leader)

Nominations 

Candidates first needed to be nominated by at least 10% (22) of current Labour MPs and MEPs, who comprise the Parliamentary Labour Party (PLP) and the European Parliamentary Labour Party (EPLP). Candidates who passed this threshold then need nominations from at least 5% (33) Constituency Labour Parties (CLPs), or at least three affiliates including at least two trades unions that together represent at least 5% of affiliated members.

The table below shows the number of nominations achieved by each candidate. A green background indicates that the candidate has met the nomination requirements. A pink background indicates that the candidate has withdrawn from the contest.

Endorsements 
Candidates and potential candidates also received the support of notable people who are not current Labour Party MPs.

Rosena Allin-Khan 
 Liz McInnes, former MP for Heywood and Middleton
 Melanie Onn, former MP for Great Grimsby

Richard Burgon 
 Laura Pidcock, former MP for North West Durham
 Mark Serwotka, leader of the Public and Commercial Services Union (PCS) trade union
 Dennis Skinner, former MP for Bolsover

Ian Murray 
 Tony Blair, former Labour Party leader, and Prime Minister
 Gordon Brown, former Labour Party leader, and Prime Minister
 Alistair Darling, Labour peer, former Chancellor of the Exchequer and former MP for Edinburgh South West
 David Hanson, former MP for Delyn
 Roy Hattersley, Labour peer and former Deputy leader of the Labour Party
 Blair McDougall, political activist
 Ruth Smeeth, former MP for Stoke-on-Trent North
 Elizabeth Smith, Labour peer and wife of John Smith
 Anna Turley, former MP for Redcar
 Phil Wilson, former MP for Sedgefield

Angela Rayner 
 Paul Sweeney, former MP for Glasgow North East
 Momentum
 Open Labour

Opinion polls

Results 
The result of the election as well as the corresponding contest for leader of the Labour Party was announced at 10:45 (BST) on 4 April 2020. The announcement was originally due to take place at a special conference in London, but because of the ongoing COVID-19 pandemic it was cancelled in favour of a "scaled-back event". Because of this, members would only find out the results by means of an email and coverage in the mainstream media.

Angela Rayner was elected. Rosena Allin-Khan came second, which was different from the results predicted by opinion polls.

Timeline

Overview

2019

November
 6 November: Tom Watson resigns as deputy leader of the Labour Party and as MP for West Bromwich East
 7 November: Dawn Butler announces her candidacy

December
 12 December: Labour loses sixty seats in the 2019 United Kingdom general election
 13 December: Jeremy Corbyn announces his resignation as leader of the Labour Party effective the outcome of the 2020 leadership election
 17 December: Khalid Mahmood announces his candidacy
 31 December: Richard Burgon announces his candidacy

2020

January 
 6 January: Angela Rayner announces her candidacy
 7 January: Rosena Allin-Khan and Ian Murray announce their candidacies
 9 January: Mahmood withdraws
 13 January: MP/MEP nominations close, party announces that Allin-Khan, Burgon, Butler, Murray and Rayner all proceed to the next round
 15 January: Nominations from CLPs and affiliates open

February 
 14 February: Nominations from CLPs and affiliates close
 24 February: Labour members receive postal ballots and online voting forms

April 
 2 April: 12:00 – Voting closes
 4 April: Result of the votes announced  at 10:45 and new Labour deputy leader announced

See also 
 2020 Labour Party leadership election
 2020 Scottish Labour deputy leadership election
 Nominations in the 2020 Labour Party deputy leadership election
 Nominations in the 2020 Labour Party leadership election

Notes

References 

2020 elections in the United Kingdom
2020 deputy
Labour Party deputy leadership election